Mel Martínez (born 1946) was a U.S. Senator from Florida from 2005 to 2009. Senator Martinez may also refer to:

Iris Martinez (born 1956), Illinois State Senate
Monica Martinez (born 1977), New York State Senate
Richard Martinez (politician) (born 1953), New Mexico State Senate
Ángel Chayanne Martínez (born 1964), Senate of Puerto Rico
Frank Martínez (politician) (fl. 1910s–1920s), Senate of Puerto Rico